Woodlands is an underwater ghost town in the Canadian province of Ontario. It is one of Ontario's Lost Villages, which were permanently flooded by the creation of the St. Lawrence Seaway in 1958.

The village was founded in 1784 by German-speaking Loyalists from New York it had a population of about 70 people and was known, in the 1950s, for the cottages that lined the road adjacent to the then bank of the St Lawrence River.

Families and businesses in Woodlands were moved to the new town of Ingleside before the seaway construction commenced.

External links
Ghosttownpix.com - Woodlands

The Lost Villages
1958 disestablishments in Ontario
Populated places disestablished in 1958